The Flight (transliteration Beg) is a 1970 Soviet historical drama film, mainly based on writer Mikhail Bulgakov's play Flight, but also on his novel The White Guard and his libretto Black Sea. It is written and directed by Aleksandr Alov and Vladimir Naumov and is the story about a group of White refugees from the Russian Civil War, eking out an existence in Istanbul and Paris in the 1920s. It was entered into the 1971 Cannes Film Festival.

Cast
 Lyudmila Savelyeva as Serafima Vladimirovna Korzukhina
 Aleksey Batalov as Sergei Pavlovich Golubkov
 Mikhail Ulyanov as General Charnota
 Tatyana Tkach as Lyuska
 Vladislav Dvorzhetsky as General Khludov
 Yevgeniy Yevstigneyev as Korzukhin
 Vladimir Zamansky as Baev
 Nikolay Olyalin as Krapilin
 Bruno Freindlich as General Vrangel
 Vladimir Basov as Artur Arturovich, the Cockroach Tsar
 Tamara Loginova as Lichiko
 Oleg Yefremov as Colonel
 Vladimir Osenev as Tikhiy
 Gotlib Roninson as Voluptuous Greek

References

External links

1970 films
1970 drama films
1970s war drama films
Soviet films based on plays
Soviet war drama films
Russian war drama films
1970s Russian-language films
Films based on works by Mikhail Bulgakov
Films set in 1920
Films set in 1928
Films set in Crimea
Films set in Istanbul
Films set in Paris
Russian Civil War films
Films shot in Bulgaria
Films shot in Crimea
Films shot in Istanbul
Films shot in Moscow
Films shot in Moscow Oblast
Films shot in Paris
Films directed by Aleksandr Alov
Films directed by Vladimir Naumov
Films based on Russian novels
Soviet epic films